PZM may refer to:

Patrulleros de Zona Marítima PZM offshore patrol vessels
Polski Związek Motorowy (en. Polish Motor Union), a member of Fédération Internationale de l'Automobile
Polska Żegluga Morska (in English: Polsteam), a  freight ship operator based in Szczecin, Poland
PZM (microphone), Pressure Zone Microphone